Governor Carr may refer to:

Caleb Carr (governor) (1616–1695), 16th Governor of the Colony of Rhode Island and Providence Plantations from 1695 to 1695
Elias Carr (1839–1900), 48th Governor of North Carolina
Ralph Lawrence Carr (1887–1950), 29th Governor of Colorado